Clifton, Rawcliffe and Poppleton  ings are temporary storage area (washland scheme) for water that flows down the River Ouse in York, England.

Approximately 2.3 million cubic metres of water is able to be stored here which lowers the flood level by about 150mm in the city.

Sluice gates on the north and south side allow water to enter and leave.

During the summer months the grassland is used by local farmers to graze their cattle.

In 1982,  £1.25 million, was spent on increasing the height and adding sluice gates as well as heightening the embankments to allow greater storage of water.

The design of the ings allow for accommodation of water for a medium order flooding.

In the event of a higher order flooding, the embankments allow overflow thus increasing capacity of the ings.

Embankments (floodwalls) 

This area makes use of a lot of embankments.

An embankment of 2.5 metres high typically has a footprint 15 metres wide which makes it unsuitable in some areas.

Within the embankment there is a central core, either clay or man made structure like concrete or metal piling. This gives added integrity and prevents water from seeping through under or over the embankment.

Flood scheme 
This is one of many flood defenses that make up a scheme. Other projects include River Foss Barrier, Leaky dams, ings, washland storage basin, walls, and embankments.

After the flooding on boxing day 26 December 2015, the UK government proposed a complete rethink on national flood defences.

One project that showed promise with the added benefit of a fraction of the cost of concrete barrier is the Pickering flood defences that composed a plan to store as much water upstream to allow soaking into the surrounding areas and prevent flooding downstream.

Animation

References 

Flood control in the United Kingdom
River Ouse, Yorkshire